The role of Chief Construction Adviser is a British civil service appointment. It was created by United Kingdom ministers in 2009 to provide cross-departmental coordination and leadership on UK construction industry policy, and discontinued in 2015.

History
The "creation of a post of Chief Construction Officer" was recommended by the House of Commons Business and Enterprise Select Committee in July 2008. The UK government directly or indirectly provides around 40% of the construction industry's workload so its influence as a client is significant.

Paul Morrell was the first person appointed to this pan-departmental role, with a slightly revised title of 'chief construction adviser', in November 2009; the role was initially for two years, and Morrell was re-appointed for a further one-year term in October 2011.

In July 2012, Morrell's successor, Peter Hansford, was announced. Hansford took up the role on 1 December 2012. On 2 July 2014, construction minister Michael Fallon announced that Hansford's term of office would be extended to November 2015.

To the dismay of many in the industry, in July 2015, the Government announced that "the role of the Chief Construction Adviser will not be continued after the incumbent Peter Hansford’s tenure ends in November 2015."

References

2009 establishments in the United Kingdom
 
Public administration
Construction industry of the United Kingdom